Duchess Gustave Caroline of Mecklenburg-Strelitz (12 July 1694 – 13 April 1748) was a daughter of Adolphus Frederick II, Duke of Mecklenburg and Princess Marie of Mecklenburg-Güstrow.

Family
Gustave Caroline was the fourth daughter and youngest child of Adolphus Frederick II, Duke of Mecklenburg by his first wife Princess Maria of Mecklenburg. She was a younger sister of Adolphus Frederick III, Duke of Mecklenburg. Through her father's third marriage, she was an aunt of Queen Charlotte of the United Kingdom.

Marriage

On 13 November 1714, Gustave Caroline married her cousin Christian Ludwig of Mecklenburg. He was the third eldest son of Frederick, Duke of Mecklenburg-Grabow and his wife Princess Christine Wilhelmine of Hesse-Homburg. Christian Ludwig succeeded as Duke of Mecklenburg-Schwerin in 1747, the year before Gustave Caroline's death.

They had five children:

 Frederick II, Duke of Mecklenburg-Schwerin (1717–1785); married Duchess Louise Frederica of Württemberg
 Louis (1725–78); married Princess Charlotte Sophie of Saxe-Coburg-Saalfeld (1731–1810).  They were the parents of Frederick Francis I, Grand Duke of Mecklenburg-Schwerin.
 Ulrike Sofie (1723–1813)
 Luise (1730)
 Amalie (1732–1775)

Ancestry

References

1694 births
1748 deaths
House of Mecklenburg-Schwerin
House of Mecklenburg-Strelitz
Duchesses of Mecklenburg-Schwerin
Duchesses of Mecklenburg-Strelitz
German duchesses
Daughters of monarchs